Tamasha is a traditional form of Marathi theatre

Tamasha may also refer to:
 Tamasha (ablution), an ablution ritual in Mandaeism
 Tamasha, Iran, a village in Karasht Rural District
 Tamasha (1952 film), a Hindi-language romantic comedy film
 Tamasha (2015 film), a Hindi-language romantic comedy film
 Tamasha (soundtrack)
 Thamaasha, a 2019 Malayalam-language film
 Tamasha, a 2022 pakistani reality show